Stout House may refer to:

Ward-Stout House, Bradford, Arkansas
Daniel Stout House, Bloomington Township, Indiana
Knight-Stout House, Finchville, Kentucky, listed on the National Register of Historic Places
Ben Stout House, Jeffersontown, Kentucky, listed on the National Register of Historic Places
Stout House (Petoskey, Michigan)
James C. and Agnes M. Stout House, Lake City, Minnesota
John Stout House, Hamilton, Montana, listed on the NRHP
Joseph Stout House, Hopewell, New Jersey, listed on the NRHP
Charles Stout House, a part of the South Fountain Avenue Historic District, Springfield, Ohio
Isaac Stout House, Williams Township, Pennsylvania